Accord plc, previously Accord Operations, was a public services provider based in Hertfordshire, England.

History
Accord was established by Stelio Stefanou in 1999 by a demerger of the John Doyle Group. On 21 September 2007, after eight years of growth, the company was acquired by Enterprise plc for £180m.

Operations
Company services included business, environmental, highways, housing and technical services mainly for local authorities. The company had some 50 offices and employed 3,000 people. It undertook the entire facilities management service for Westminster City Council.

References

External links

Business services companies of the United Kingdom
Construction and civil engineering companies of the United Kingdom
Streetworks
Business services companies established in 1999
British companies established in 1999
Construction and civil engineering companies established in 1999